This is a list of historians categorized by their area of study. See also List of historians.

By time period

Ancient history 
 Sedat Alp (1913, Veroia, The Ottoman Empire - 2006, Ankara, Türkiye) Hittitolog- Historian, Ancient Anatolian
 Ekrem Akurgal (1911, Haifa, The Ottoman Empire- 2002, İzmir, Türkiye) Archaeologist- Historian, Ancient Anatolian
 Leonie Archer (born 1955) – Graeco-Roman Palestine
 Mary Beard (born 1955)
 Anatoly Bokschanin (1903–1979) – Roman history
 Fernand Braudel (1902, Luméville-en-Ornois- 1985, Cluses- France ) Roman history
 Thomas Robert Shannon Broughton (1900-1903) – Roman history and prosopography
 Halet Çambel (1916, Berlin, Germany- 2014, İstanbul, Türkiye) Archaeologist- Historian, Ancient Anatolian
 Michael Crawford (born 1939)
 Roland Étienne (born 1944, French) – Ancient Greece and Hellenistic period
 Moses Finley (1912–1986)
 Edward Gibbon (1737–1794) – The History of the Decline and Fall of the Roman Empire
 Adrian Goldsworthy (born 1969, British) – Roman history
 Peter Green (born 1924) – Ancient Greece and Macedon
 Herodotus
 Keith Hopkins (1934–2004) - Roman history
 Muazzez İlmiye Çığ (born 1914, Bursa-Türkiye) Sumerologist, Sumerian history
 Josephus
 Yuliya Kolosovskaya (1920–2002) – Roman history and Roman provinces of the Danube
 Sergey Kovalev (1886–1960) – Hellenistic and Roman period
 Mikhail Kublanov (1914–1998) 
 Barbara Levick (born 1931) – Roman emperors
 Livy
 Ramsay MacMullen (1928–2022) – History of Rome
 Nikolai Mashkin (1900–1950) – Roman history
 Fergus Millar (1935–2019)
 Theodor Mommsen (1817–1903) History of Rome
 Barthold Georg Niebuhr (1776–1831) – Roman history
 Orosius
 Tahsin Özgüç (1916, Kardzhali, The Ottoman Empire- 2005, Ankara, Türkiye) Archaeologist- Historian, Ancient Anatolian
 Edward Togo Salmon (1905–1988) - Roman history
 Howard Hayes Scullard (1903–1983) – Roman civilization
 Mariya Sergeyenko (1891–1987) – Roman agriculture and daily life
 Ram Sharan Sharma (1919–2011) – Ancient India
 Elena Shtaerman (1914–1991) – Roman history
 Suetonius
 Ronald Syme (1903–1989) – Classical period
 Tacitus
 Joseph Tainter (born 1949)
 Lily Ross Taylor (1886-1969) - Roman history
 Thucydides
 Andrew Wallace-Hadrill (born 1951)
 Max Weber (1864–1920)
 Xenophon
 Polybius

Medieval history 
 John Van Antwerp Fine Jr. (born 1939) - American medievalist specialized in the history of Central and Southeastern Europe, and Balkans
 Ram Sharan Sharma (1919–2011) – early medieval History of India
 Hakim Syed Zillur Rahman (born 1940) – historian of medieval medicine
 Placido Puccinelli (1609–1685, Italian) – Northern Italy in the 10th century and the Florentine church
 Marc Bloch (1886–1944, French) – Medieval France
 John Boswell (1947–1994, American) – Homosexuality in the Middle Ages
 Norman Cantor (1930–2004)
 Georges Duby (1924–1996, French) – Specialized in the history of France between the Capets and the Valois
 François-Louis Ganshof (1895–1980), Belgian – wrote on early medieval institutional history and feudalism
 Geoffrey of Monmouth
 Giraldus Cambrensis
 Johan Huizinga (1872–1945, Dutch) – cultural history, wrote Waning of the Middle Ages
 Jacques Le Goff (1924–2014, French) – Middle Ages, particularly the 12th and 13th centuries
 Rev. F. X. Martin (1922–2000, Irish) – Mediævalist and campaigner
 Rosamond McKitterick (born 1949) – Frankish and Carolingian history
 Henri Pirenne (1862–1935) – the "Pirenne Thesis" of early Medieval development
 Eileen Power (1889–1940) – Middle Ages
 Miri Rubin (born 1956) – social and religious history, 1100–1500
 Steven Runciman (1903–2000) – the Crusades
 Richard Southern (1912–2001)
 Sidney Painter (1902–1960)
 John Julius Norwich (1929–2018)
 John V. Tolan (born 1959)
 Chris Wickham (born 1950)
 Retha Warnicke (born 1939)
 Aaron Gurevich (1924–2006)
 Jerome Lee Shneidman (1929–2008) – psychohistory
 Michael Prestwich (born 1943)
 Alessandro Barbero (born 1959)
 Dick Harrison (born 1966)
 Satish Chandra (1922–2017)
 Irfan Habib (born 1931)
 Michel Kaplan (born 1946, French) – Byzantinist

By nation or geographical area

North America

History of Canada 
 Donald Creighton (1902–1979) – Developed the Laurentian thesis
 William J. Eccles (1917–1998) – History of New France
 Lionel Groulx (1878–1967) – The history of Quebec in particular and French North America in general
 Harold Innis (1894–1952) – Economic historian of Canada
 Jack Granatstein (born 1939) – Political and Military historian of Canada
 W.L. Morton (1908–1980) – Expert on western Canada

See also List of Canadian historians.

History of the Caribbean 
 Kamau Brathwaite (1930–2020)
 Aviva Chomsky (born 1957)
 C. L. R. James (1901–1989)
 Lucille M. Mair (1924–2009)
 Walter Rodney (1942–1980)
 Eric Williams (1911–1981) – Focused on slavery and the slave trade, condemned imperialism
 Betty Wood (1945–2021)

History of the United States 

 Henry Adams (1838–1918) – history of the United States in the presidential administrations of Thomas Jefferson and James Madison
 Stephen Ambrose (1936–2002) – biographer of Presidents Dwight D. Eisenhower and Richard M. Nixon
 Edward L. Ayers (born 1953) – U.S. South,  founder of the Institute for Advanced Technology in the Humanities (IATH) and Digital Scholarship Lab
 George Bancroft (1800–1891) – wrote first large-scale history of the US
 Charles A. Beard (1874–1948) – revisionist history of Founding Fathers suggesting monetary motivations
 Samuel Flagg Bemis (1891–1973) – U.S. foreign policy; won two Pulitzer Prizes
 Ira Berlin (1941–2018) - Slavery
 William Brandon (1914–2002) – historian of the American West and Native Americans.
 Holly Brewer (born 1964) – early American History
 Alan Brinkley (1949–2019) – historian of the Great Depression
 David H. Burton - U.S. historian and biographer of presidents Theodore Roosevelt and William Howard Taft as well as Clara Barton and Oliver Wendell Holmes Jr.
 Bruce Catton (1899–1978) – American Civil War
 William Cronon (born 1954) – American environmental history, the frontier in New England, and the American West
 J. Frank Dobie (1888–1964) – historian of Texas and the Southwestern United States
 David Herbert Donald (1920–2009)
 W. E. B. Du Bois (1868–1963) – historian of the Reconstruction
 Drew Gilpin Faust (born 1947) – Civil War, culture of death, and the Confederacy
 Robert H. Ferrell (1921–2018) – Harry S. Truman, the 20th-century U.S. presidency, World War I
 Eric Foner (born 1943) – Civil War and Reconstruction
 Shelby Foote (1916–2005) – American Civil War
 John Hope Franklin (1915–2009) – historian of African Americans
 John A. Garraty (1920–2007) – biography
 Elizabeth Fox-Genovese (1941–2007) – Southern slavery, women's history
 Doris Kearns Goodwin (born 1943) - U.S. presidents, won a Pulitzer Prize in 1995 for No Ordinary Time: Franklin and Eleanor Roosevelt: The Home Front in World War II 
 Richard Hofstadter (1916–1970) – Progressivism and U.S. political history
 Daniel Walker Howe - political and intellectual history of the early republic and antebellum period 
 Peter Iverson – 20th century U.S. West/Native American history (emphasis in Navajo history)
 Paul Johnson (born 1928) – author of A History of the American People and a biographer of George Washington
 Winthrop Jordan (1931–2007) – African-American history
 David Lavender (1910–2003) – Western U.S.
 David McCullough (1933-2022) – general study, most notable work is recent biography of John Adams
 James M. McPherson (born 1936) – American Civil War
 Pauline Maier (1938–2013) – late Colonial, Revolution, Constitution
 D. W. Meinig (1924-2020) – geographic history of America
 Philip D. Morgan (born 1949) – slavery
 David Nasaw  (born 1945) – biography and U.S. cultural history
 Francis Parkman (1823–1893) – historian of the French and Indian War
 William B. Pickett (born 1940)
 David Pietrusza (born 1949) - 20th century presidential elections; biography
 Dominic Sandbrook (born 1974) – political history of the 1960s and 1970s
 Arthur Schlesinger Sr. (1888–1965)
 Arthur Schlesinger Jr. (1917–2007)
 Cornelius Cole Smith, Jr. (1913–2004) – historian of Arizona, California and the Southwestern United States
 Jean Edward Smith (1932–2019) – biography, foreign policy, political economy, constitutional law, legal history, and politics
 Irma Tam Soong (1912–2001) – history of Chinese immigration in Hawaii
 Frederick Jackson Turner (1861–1932) – developed the Frontier Thesis
 Frank Vandiver (1925–2005)
 Alexander Scott Withers (1792–1865) – primary accounts of colonial western Virginia conflicts
 Sean Wilentz (born 1951) - political, social, and cultural history
 Betty Wood (1945–2021) – early American history
 Gordon S. Wood (born 1933) - American Revolution
 C. Vann Woodward (1908–1999) – Southern United States
 Howard Zinn (1922–2010) – political scientist and historian of the United States, often critical of common policies

Latin America

History of Latin America 
See also :Category:Historians of Latin America
 Jeremy Adelman (born 1960)
 Marc Becker
 David Brading (born 1936)
 Aviva Chomsky (born 1957)
 James Dunkerley (born 1953)
 Mark Falcoff (born 1941)
 Ann Farnsworth-Alvear
 Charles Gibson (born 1943)
 Mike Gonzalez (born 1943)
 Clarence H. Haring (1885–1960)
 Daniel James (born 1948)
 Kenneth Maxwell (born 1941)
 William H. Prescott (1796–1859)
 Peter Winn
 John Wirth (1936–2002)
 John Womack (born 1937)
 Leslie Bethell (born 1937)

Brazil 
 Boris Fausto (born 1930)
 Lilia Moritz Schwarcz (born 1957)

Chile 
 Alonso de Góngora Marmolejo (1523–1575)
 Pedro Mariño de Lobera (1528–1594)
 Vicente Carvallo y Goyeneche (1742–1816)

Peru 
 Jorge Basadre (1903–1980)
 Raúl Porras Barrenechea (1897–1960)
 María Rostworowski (1915–2016)

Europe

History of Europe 
 Patricia Clavin (born 1964) – international relations and transnational relations
 Norman Davies (born 1939) – Europe as a whole
 Tony Judt (1948–2010) – post 1945
 Elizabeth Eisenstein (1923–2016) – early printing and transitions in media
 Julia P. Gelardi – royal history of 19th and 20th centuries
 John Lukacs (1924–2019) – Cold War
 Henri-Jean Martin (1924–2007) – early printing and writing
 Effie Pedaliu – history of Italian war crimes and Cold war
 Henri Pirenne (1862–1935) – Belgium
 Walter Alison Phillips (1864–1950)
 Andrew Roberts (born 1963) – Second World War
 John Roberts (1928–2003) – Europe
 J. Salwyn Schapiro (1879–1973)
 Norman Stone (1941–2019)
 Charlotte Zeepvat – royal history of 19th and 20th centuries

History of Albania 
 Stavro Skëndi (1905-1989)

History of Belgium 
 Henri Pirenne (1862–1935) – Middle Ages
 Sophie de Schaepdrijver (born 1961) – World War I
 Herman Van der Wee (born 1928) – social and economic history

History of Bosnia and Herzegovina 
 İbrahim Peçevi (1572–1650)
 Antun Knežević (1834–1889)
 Bono Benić (1708–1785)
 Hamdija Kreševljaković (1888–1959)
 Smail Balić (1920–2002)
 Enver Redžić (1915–2009)
 Marko Vego (1907–1985) – medievalist & archaeologists
 Mustafa Imamović (1941–2017)
 Salmedin Mesihović (born 1975) – medievalist & archaeologists

History of England and Britain 

 Donald Adamson (born 1939) – British
 Robert C. Allen (born 1947) – British economic
 Perry Anderson (born 1938) – British; European history
 Leonie Archer (born 1955) – British
 Karen Armstrong (born 1944) – religious
 Gerald Aylmer (1926–2000) – British; administrative history
 Bernard Bailyn (1922–2020) – Atlantic migration
 Onyeka – Black Britons
 The Venerable Bede (672–735) – Britain from 55 BC to 731 AD
 Brian Bond (born 1936) – military
 Asa Briggs (1921–2016) – British social.
 Herbert Butterfield (1900–1979) – historiography
 Angus Calder (1942–2008) – Second World War
 David Cannadine (born 1950) – Modern Britain, British business and philanthropy
 J.C.D. Clark (born 1951) – 18th century
 G.S.R. Kitson Clark (1900-1975) - Victorian period
 Linda Colley (born 1949) – 18th century
 Patrick Collinson (1929–2011) – Elizabethan England & Puritanism
 Maurice Cowling (1926-2005) – 19th and 20th century politics
 John Darwin (born 1948) – British Empire
 John Davies (1938–2015) - Wales
 Susan Doran – Elizabethan 
 Eamon Duffy (born 1947) – religious history of the 15th–17th centuries
 Harold James Dyos (1921–1978) – urban
 Geoffrey Rudolph Elton (1921–1994) – Tudor period
 Charles Harding Firth (1857–1936) – political history of the 17th century
 Antonia Fraser (born 1932) – 17th century
 William Gibson (born 1959) – ecclesiastical history
 Samuel Rawson Gardiner (1829–1902) – political history of the 17th century
 Ruth Goodman (born 1963) – early modern
 Andrew Gordon (born 1951) – naval
 Geoffrey of Monmouth (died c. 1154) – England
 Élie Halévy (1870-1937) - British 19th century
 Edward Hasted (1732–1812) – Kent
 Max Hastings (born 1945) – military, Second World War
 J. H. Hexter (1910–1996) – England in the 17th century
 Christopher Hill (1912–2003) – England in the 17th century
 Gertrude Himmelfarb (1922–2019) – social and cultural history of the Victorian period
 Eric Hobsbawn (1917–2012) – Marxist British history
 David Hume (1711–1776) – Scottish Enlightenment philosopher and author of the six volume History of England (originally History of Britain)
 Edward Hyde, 1st Earl of Clarendon (1609–1674) – English Civil Wars
 John Edward Lloyd (1861–1947) – early Welsh history
 Thomas Babington Macaulay, 1st Baron Macaulay (1800–1859) – English writer and historian whose most famous work was The History of England from the Accession of James the Second
 John Morrill (born 1946) Seventeenth-century political and military history
 Lewis Bernstein Namier (1888–1960) – political history of the 18th century
 Kenneth Morgan (born 1934) – modern Wales
 Steven Pincus – 17th and 18th century England
 Andrew Roberts (born 1963) – Political biographies, 19th and 20th centuries
 A. L. Rowse (1903–1997) – Cornish history and Elizabethan England
 Dominic Sandbrook (born 1974) – Britain in the 1960s and after
 John Robert Seeley (1834–1895) – British political history of the modern period
 Jack Simmons (1915–2000) – railways, topography
 Paul Slack (born 1943) – Early Modern British Social history
 David Spring (1918-2004) - British 19th century 
 David Starkey (born 1945) – Tudor historian and TV presenter
 Lawrence Stone (1919–1999) – English society and the history of the family
 Keith Thomas (born 1933) – Early Modern English Society
 E. P. Thompson (1924–1993) – British working class
 George Macaulay Trevelyan (1876–1962) – English history (many different periods)
 Hugh Trevor-Roper, Baron Dacre of Glanton (1914-2003) – Britain in the 17th century
 Retha Warnicke (born 1939) – Tudor history and gender issues
 Andy Wood (born 1967) – British social historian, 1500 to present
 Daniel Woolf (born 1958) – Early Modern England and History of Historical Writing
 Cicely Veronica Wedgwood (1910–1997) – British 
 G. M. Young (1882-1959) - Victorian England
 Perez Zagorin (1920–2009) –  16th and 17th centuries
Karl W Schweizer(1946--)18th century British politics and diplomacy

History of the British Empire 

 Antoinette Burton
 Robert Bickers (born 1964)
 Richard Drayton (born 1964)
 Gerald S. Graham (1903–1988)
 Vincent T. Harlow (1898–1961)
 Wm. Roger Louis (born 1936)
 P. J. Marshall (born 1933)
 David Quinn (1909–2002)
 D. M. Schurman (1924–2013)
 Archibald Paton Thornton (1921–2004)
 Glyndwr Williams (born 1932)

History of Croatia 
 Johannes Lucius (1604–1679)
 Pavao Ritter Vitezović (1652–1713)
 Franjo Rački (1828–1894)
 Tadija Smičiklas (1843–1914)
 Vjekoslav Klaić (1849–1928)
 Ferdo Šišić (1869–1940)
 Nada Klaić (1920–1988)
 Mirjana Gross (1922–2012)
 Trpimir Macan (born 1935)
 Ivo Banac (1947–2020)
 Radoslav Katičić (1930–2019)

History of Finland 
 Kesar Ordin (1835–1892)
 Mikhail Borodkin (1852–1919)

History of France 
 Marc Bloch (1886–1944) – medieval France	
 Jean-Jacques Becker (born 1928) - French historian of contemporary history
 Vincent Cronin (1924–2011) – Louis XIV, Louis XVI, Marie Antoinette, Napoleon, and Paris	
 Natalie Zemon Davis (born 1928) – early modern France	
 Georges Duby (1924–1996) – medieval France	
 Lucien Febvre (1878–1956) – French historian	
 Alistair Horne (1925–2017) – modern French military history	
 Julian T. Jackson (born 1954) – French historian	
 Douglas Johnson (1925–2005) – historian of modern France	
 Simon Kitson (born c. 1967) – historian of Vichy France	
 Emmanuel Le Roy Ladurie (born 1929) – history of the French peasantry	
 Michael Marrus (born 1941) – Vichy France	
 John M. Merriman (born 1946) - French Historian 	
 Jules Michelet (1798–1874) – French historian	
 Roland Mousnier (1907–1993) – early modern France	
 Robert Roswell Palmer (1909–2002) – French revolution	
 Robert Paxton (born 1932) – Vichy France	
 Pierre Renouvin (1893–1974) – French diplomatic history	
 Andrew Roberts (born 1963) – Napoleon	
 John C. Rule (1929–2013) – 17th and 18th century France	
 Zeev Sternhell (1935–2020) – French fascism	
 Eugen Weber (1925–2007) – modern French history	
 John B. Wolf (1907–1996) – French history	
 Isser Woloch (born 1937) – 18th century France	
 Gordon Wright (1912–2000)	
 Robert J. Young (born 1942) – the Third Republic	
See also List of historians of the French Revolution.

History of Germany 
 Celia Applegate – music history and nationalism
 David Blackbourn (born 1949)
 Gisela Bock (born 1942)
 Horst Boog (1928–2016) – military history
 Karl Dietrich Bracher (1922–2016)
 Martin Broszat (1926–1989)
 Alan Bullock (1914–2004)
 Robert Citino (born 1958) – military history
 Gordon A. Craig (1913–2005)
 Richard J. Evans (born 1947)
 Joachim Fest (1926–2006)
 Fritz Fischer (1908–1999)
 Luise Gerbing (1855–1927), history of Thuringia
 Deborah Hertz (born 1949)
 Klaus Hildebrand (born 1941)
 Andreas Hillgruber (1925–1989)
 Jonathan House (born 1950)
 Christian Hartmann (born 1959) – military history
 Gerhard Hirschfeld (born 1946) – 20th century German social, World War I & II
 Eberhard Jäckel (1929–2017)
 Ian Kershaw (born 1943)
 Klemens von Klemperer (1916–2012)
 Ernst Klink (1923–1993) – military history
 Claudia Koonz (born 1940)
 Dieter Langewiesche (born 1943)
 Timothy Mason (1940–1990)
 Frank McDonough (born 1957)
 Wendy Lower (born 1965) – history of National Socialism 
 Geoffrey P. Megargee (born 1959) – military history
 Friedrich Meinecke (1862–1954)
 Hans Mommsen (1930–2015)
 Wolfgang Mommsen (1930–2004)
 George Mosse (1918–1999)
 Elliot Neaman (born 1957)
 Ernst Nolte (1923–2016)
 Steven Ozment (1939–2019)
 Detlev Peukert (1950–1990)
 Koppel Pinson (1904–1961)
 Gerhard Ritter (1888–1967)
 Hans Rothfels (1891–1976)
 David Schoenbaum (born 1935)
 Jean Edward Smith (1932–2019)
 Ronald Smelser (born 1942)
 Louis Leo Snyder (1907–1993)
 Fritz Stern (1926–2016)
 David Stahel (born 1975)
 Michael Stürmer (born 1938)
 Heinrich von Treitschke (1834–1896)
 A.J.P. Taylor (1906–1990)
 Hugh Trevor-Roper (1914–2003) – British historian and peer who specialized on Nazi leadership and incorrectly verified the authenticity of The Hitler Diaries
 Henry Ashby Turner (1932–2008)
 Gerd R. Ueberschär (born 1943) – military history
 Bernd Wegner (born 1949) – military history and history of National Socialism 
 Hans-Ulrich Wehler (1931–2014)
 Wolfram Wette (born 1940) – military history and history of National Socialism 
 John Wheeler-Bennett (1902–1975)
 Jay Winter (born 1945)
 Michael Wolffsohn (born 1947)
 Gordon Wright (1912–2000) – Germany – 19th and 20th centuries
 David T. Zabecki (born 1947) – military history
 Alfred-Maurice de Zayas (born 1947)
 Rainer Zitelmann (born 1957)

History of the Habsburg monarchy 
 John Komlos (born 1944) – economic

History of Ireland 
 Mary Bonaventure Browne (after 1610–after 1670), Poor Clare and historian
 Ann Buckley
 Francis John Byrne (1934–2017)
 John Clyn (fl. 1333–1349)
 James Donnelly (born 1943) – Irish social history
 Brian Farrell (1929–2014)
 Roy Foster (born 1949) 
 Kathleen Hughes (1926–1977)
 Geoffrey Keating
 J.J. Lee (born 1942) – 20th century Ireland
 James Francis Lydon (1928–2013)
 F.S.L. Lyons (1923–1983) – modern Ireland
 Oliver MacDonagh (1924–2002) – modern Ireland
 Dermot MacDermot (1906–1989)
 Dubhaltach MacFhirbhisigh (fl. 1643–1671)
 Gilla Isa Mor mac Donnchadh MacFhirbhisigh (fl. 1390–1418)
 Muirchu moccu Machtheni (fl. late 7th century)
 Flann Mainistrech (died 1056)
 F.X. Martin (1922–2000)
 Kenneth Nicholls
 Adhamh Ó Cianáin (died 1373)
 Mícheál Ó Cléirigh (c. 1590–1643)
 Dáibhí Ó Cróinín (born 1954)
 Eugene O'Curry (1794–1862)
 John O'Donovan (1806–1861)
 Seán Mór Ó Dubhagáin (died 1372)
 Pilip Ballach Ó Duibhgeannáin (fl. 1579–1590)
 Ruaidhrí Ó Flaithbheartaigh (1629–1718)
 Nollaig Ó Muraíle
 Tírechán (fl. late 7th century)
 Father Paul Walsh (1885–1941)
 Sir James Ware (1594–1666)

History of Italy 
 Lorenzo Arnone Sipari (born 1973) – social and environmental Italian history
 R.J.B. Bosworth (born 1943) – Fascism, Mussolini
 Benedetto Croce (1866–1952) – philosophy of history, modern Italian history
 Vincent Cronin (1924–2011) – Renaissance art and Sicily
 Renzo De Felice (1929–1996) – Fascism, biographer of Mussolini
 John Foot (born 1964) – modern Italy history, The City
 Emilio Gentile (born 1946) – Fascism
 Carlo Ginzburg (born 1939) – witchcraft and agrarian cults, microhistory
 Alessandra Kersevan (born 1950) – Italian concentration camps
 Claudio Pavone (1920–2016) – Italian fascism, World War II, anti-fascism
 Effie Pedaliu – Italian war crimes
 John Pollard (born 1944) – The church and Fascism
 Paul Ginsborg (born 1945) – The Risorgimento, Italian modern and contemporary history
 Lucy Riall (born 1962) – The Risorgimento, Garibaldi, Sicily
 Gaetano Salvemini (1873–1957) – Fascism, French Revolution
 Denis Mack Smith (1920–2017) – Italian modern history
 Arrigo Petacco (1929–2018) – Fascism

History of Moldova/Bessarabia 
 Nicolae Iorga (1871–1940)
 Ion Nistor (1876–1962)
 Petre Cazacu (1873–1956)
 Charles King (born 1967)
 Igor Casu (born 1973)
 Gh. Cojocaru (born 1963)

History of the Netherlands 
 Jaap R. Bruijn (born 1938)
 Femme Gaastra (born 1945)
 Pieter Geyl (1887–1966)
 John Lothrop Motley (1814–1877)
 Jonathan Israel (born 1946)
 G. J. Renier (1892–1962)
 Herbert H. Rowen (1916–1999)
 Simon Schama (born 1945)

History of Norway

History of Poland 
 Norman Davies (born 1939) – modern Polish history
 Robert I. Frost (born 1958) — modern Polish history
 Pawel Jasienica (1909–1970) – Polish amateur historian
 Wickham Steed (1871–1956)

History of Portugal 
 José Hermano Saraiva (1919–2012)
 A. H. de Oliveira Marques (1933–2007) – early modern period
 José Mattoso (born 1933) – medieval history
 Fernando Rosas (born 1946) – contemporary history

History of Romania 
 Lucian Boia (born 1944)
 Bogdan Petriceicu Hasdeu (1838–1907)
 Nicolae Iorga (1871–1940)
 Mihail Kogalniceanu (1817–1891)
 Irina Livezeanu (born 1952)
 David Mitrany (1888–1975)
 Vladimir Tismaneanu (born 1951)
 Alexandru D. Xenopol (1847–1920)
 Alexandru Zub (born 1934)

History of Russia 
 Nicholas Bethell (1938–2007)
 Robert Conquest (1917–2015) – Soviet Union
 Vincent Cronin (1924–2011) – Catherine the Great
 Orlando Figes (born 1959)
 Patricia Kennedy Grimsted (born 1935) – post-Soviet archives
 Geoffrey Hosking (born 1942)
 Lindsey Hughes (1949–2007) - C17th and C18th
 Leopold Labedz (1920–1993)
 Roy Medvedev (born 1925)
 Robin Milner-Gulland (born 1936) - cultural history
 Richard Pipes (1923–2018) – Soviet Union
 William Taubman (born 1941) – Nikita Khrushchev
 Peter Kenez (born 1937) – Soviet Union and Soviet cinema
 Robert Service (born 1947)
 Adam Ulam (1922–2000)
 Anne Applebaum (born 1964) – Gulag history
 Sheila Fitzpatrick (born 1941) – everyday life under Stalinism
 Nicolas Werth (born 1950) – political repressions
 Nikita Petrov (born 1957) – political repressions
 Viktor Danilov (1927–2016) – history of collectivization
 Oleg Khlevniuk (born 1959) – Stalin and Politburo
 Moshe Lewin (1921–2010) – collectivization
 David Shearer (born 1957) – Stalinist repressions

History of Serbia 
Vladimir Ćorović (1885–1941)
Sima Ćirković (1929–2009)
Rade Mihaljčić (1937–2020)
Stojan Novaković (1842–1915)
Stanoje Stanojević (1874–1937)
Jovan I. Deretić (1939–2021)

History of Scotland 

 G. W. S. Barrow (1924–2013)
 Steve Boardman
 Hector Boece (1465–1536)
 George Buchanan (1506–1582)
 Gilbert Burnet (1643–1715)
 Tom Devine
 John of Fordun
 Christopher Harvie (born 1944)
 Colin Kidd (born 1964)
 Michael Lynch (born 1946)
 Norman Macdougall
 Rosalind Mitchison (1919–2002)
 Richard Oram
 T.C. Smout (born 1933) - Scottish social history
 Nigel Tranter (1909–2000)
 Christopher Whatley
 Jenny Wormald (1942–2015)

Historiographer Royal of Scotland 
 James Fall, 1682
 William Robertson (1721–1793), 1763–1793
 John Gillies (1747–1836), 1793–1836
 George Brodie (1786–1967), 1836–1867
 John Hill Burton (1809–1881), 1867–1881
 William Forbes Skene (1809–1892), 1881–1893
 David Masson (1822–1907), 1893–1908
 Peter Hume Brown (1849–1918), 1908–1919
 Robert Rait (1874–1936), 1919–1930
 Robert Kerr Hannay(1867–1940), FRSE, 1930–1940
 J. D. Mackie (1887–1978), OBE, 1958–1978
 Gordon Donaldson (1913–1993), CBE, 1979–1993
 Christopher Smout (born 1933), CBE, since 1993

History of Slovakia 
 Vojtech Čelko (born 1946) – political and cultural history of Central Europe in the 20th century; history of Czechoslovak exile after 1948
 Ladislav Deák (1931–2011) – foreign policy of Central European states and Yugoslavia in the interwar period; history of Hungarian-Slovak foreign relationships
 Gabriela Dudeková (born 1968) – social policy of Austria-Hungary; situation of POWs and civilians in World War I; history of feminism and gender studies
 Ivan Kamenec (born 1938) – Holocaust in Slovakia; diplomacy in Central Europe in the interwar period and during World War II
 Adam František Kollár (1718–1783) – influential jurist, historian and ethnologist, who coined the term ethnology
 Peter Kopecký – history of diplomacy and foreign policy of Slovakia
 Juraj Marusiak (born 1970) – history of Slovak-Polish relationships; modern history of Central and Eastern Europe
 Thomas Spira (1923–2005) – study of nationalism and ethnicity (born and raised in Slovakia)
 Pavel Jozef Šafárik (1795–1861) – philologist, poet, Slavist, literary historian and ethnographer
 Štefan Šutaj (born 1954) – history of Hungarian minority in Czechoslovakia; Slovak civic (non-communist) political parties after 1945
 Zora Mintalová – Zubercová (born 1950) – food history and material culture of Central Europe

History of Slovenia 
 Bogo Grafenauer (1916–1995)
 Alessandra Kersevan (born 1950) – Italian concentration camps
 Vasilij Melik (1921–2009) – Slovene Lands in the 19th century.
 Jože Pirjevec (born 1940) – Foibe massacres
 Milica Kacin Wohinz (born 1930) – Italianization of Slovenes between 1918 and 1943
 Marta Verginella (born 1960) – history of the Slovene minority in Italy (1920–1947)

History of Spain 
 Ida Altman (born 1950) – Early modern Spain, colonial Latin America
 Roger Collins (born 1949) – medieval history, Spain, Visigothic Spain, history of Muslim Spain
 Rafael Núñez Florencio (born 1956)
 Julian Ribera y Tarragó (1858–1934) – Spain, history of the Book, medieval history, history of Muslim Spain
 Julia Pavón (born 1968) – medieval history of Navarra
 Joseph Pérez (1931-2020) - history of the Spanish Empire.

History of Sweden 
 Peter Englund (born 1957)
 Anders Fryxell (1795–1881)
 Erik Gustaf Geijer (1783–1847)
 Jan Glete (1947–2009)
 Carl Grimberg (1875–1941)
 Dick Harrison (born 1966)
 Ragnhild Hatton (1913–1995) – biographer of King Charles XII
 Sten Lindroth (1914–1980)
 Erik Lönnroth (1910–2002)
 Olaus Magnus (1490–1557)
 Samuel von Pufendorf (1632–1694)
 Erik Ringmar (born 1960)
 Michael Roberts (1908–1996)
 John Robinson (1650–1723)
 Curt Weibull (1886–1991)
 Lauritz Weibull (1873–1960)

History of Yugoslavia 
 Ivo Banac (1947–2020)
 Misha Glenny (born 1958)
 Barbara Jelavich (1923–1995) – wrote extensively on Balkan history, along with her husband Charles Jelavich
 John R. Lampe – author of Yugoslavia As History: Twice There Was a Country
 Stevan K. Pavlowitch (born 1933)
 Catherine Samary – author of Yugoslavia Dismembered
 Stephen Schwartz (born 1948)
 Jozo Tomasevich (1908–1994)

Europe and Asia

History of The Republic of Turkey and Turkish Empires 
 Halil İnalcık (1916–2016), İstanbul, Türkiye), history of the Ottoman Empire and the Republic of Turkey 
 İlber Ortaylı (born 1947, Bregen, Österreich), history of the Ottoman Empire and the Republic of Turkey 
 Heath W. Lowry (born 1942, America), history of the Ottoman Empire and modern Turkey
 Mehmet Fuat Köprülü (1890–1966, İstanbul, Türkiye), Turcologist and historian, history of the Ottoman Empire and the Republic of Turkey
 Yusuf Halaçoğlu (born 1949, Adana, Türkiye), history of the Ottoman Empire and the Republic of Turkey
 Reşat Ekrem Koçu (1905–1975, İstanbul, Türkiye), writer and historian, history of the Ottoman Empire
 Ahmed Cevad Pasha (Kabaağaçlızade Ahmet Cevat Paşa) (1851–1900, İstanbul, Türkiye), Ottoman statesman (Grand Vizier), history of the Ottoman Empire
 Aşıkpaşazade (Âşıkpasazâde Derviş Ahmet Âşıkî) (yak. 1400, Amasya–yak. 1484), Ottoman Empire/ Türkiye) history of the Ottoman Empire
 Ibn Kemal (Kemal Paşazade (ibn-i Kemâl)) (1468–1534, The Ottoman Empire/Türkiye), Ottoman statesman, history of the Ottoman Empire
 Koçi Bey (Mustafa Koçi Bey) (?–1650, The Ottoman Empire/Türkiye), Ottoman statesman, history of the Ottoman Empire
 Katip Çelebi (Haci Halife Kalfa) (1609–1657, İstanbul, The Ottoman Empire/Türkiye), history of the Ottoman Empire

Asia

Middle East 
 George Antonius (1891–1941) – historian of Arab nationalism
 Vincent Cronin (1924–2011) – study of the Faiqani tribe of South Persia
 Neilson Debevoise (1903–1992) – history of the Parthian Empire
 Caroline Finkel
 Hamilton Alexander Rosskeen Gibb (1895–1971) – Editor, The Encyclopaedia of Islam
 Bernard Lewis (1916–2018) – history of Islam and the Middle East
 Albert Hourani (1915–1993)
 ‘Ala’ al-Din ‘Ata Malik Juvayni (1226–1283) – Ta’rīkh-I-Jahān Gushā (A History of the World-Conqueror Chingis Khān)
 Ibn Khaldun (1332–1406)
 Walid Khalidi (born 1925) – Palestinian historian
 D. S. Margoliouth (1858–1940)
 Michael Oren (born 1955)
 Rashid-al-Din Hamadani (circa 1247–1318) – Jāmi‛ al-Tawārīkh (Compendium of Chronicles), Ta’rīkh–i-Ghāzānī (a history of the Mongols and Turks)
 Heleen Sancisi-Weerdenburg (1944–2000) – Achaemenid history
 Ibn al-Tiqtaqa (born c. 1262) – Shi'i historian, wrote Al-Fakhīr

Central Asia 
 Denis Sinor (1916–2011), Hungarian-American historian of Central Asia
 Edward A. Allworth (1920–2016), American historian specializing in Central Asia
 Étienne de la Vaissière (born 1969), French specialist of Sogdian culture and early medieval Central Asia
 Geoffrey Wheeler (1897–1990), British soldier and historian of Central Asia
 Lola Dodkhudoeva (born 1951), Tajikistani historian specialising in medieval Central Asian affairs
 Svetlana Gorshenina (born 1969), Uzbek specialist on Pre-Islamic Central Asia

South Asia

History of the Indian Subcontinent 
 Muzaffar Alam (born 1947)
 A. L. Basham (1914–1986)
 Chris Bayly (1945–2015)
 Dipesh Chakrabarty (born 1948)
 Bernard Cohn (1928–2003)
 Sir Jadunath Sarkar (1870–1958)
 R. C. Majumdar (1884–1980)
 Niharranjan Ray (1903–1981)
 Datto Vaman Potdar (1890–1979)
 Tryambak Shankar Shejwalkar (1895–1963)
 Ram Sharan Sharma (1919–2011)
 Nicholas Dirks
 Ranajit Guha (born 1923)
 Ayesha Jalal (born 1956)
 John Keay (born 1941)
 Sumit Sarkar (born 1939)
 Romila Thapar (born 1931)
 Thomas Metcalf (born 1934)
 Barbara Metcalf (born 1941)
 Percival Spear (1901–1982)
 Bipan Chandra (1928–2014)
 Gyan Prakash (born 1952)
 Tanika Sarkar
 Barbara Ramusack (born 1937)
 Thomas Trautmann (born 1940)
 K. K. Aziz (1927–2009)
 Mubarak Ali (born 1941)
 Mohammad Ishaq Khan (1946–2013)
 NS Rajaram (1943–2019)
Sukumar Sen (linguist)
Suniti Kumar Chatterji

History of India 
 Hakim Syed Zillur Rahman (born 1940) – Unani historian

History of Pakistan 
 K. K. Aziz (1927–2009)
 Imran Khan (born 1952)

Far East

History of Japan 
 William George Aston (1841–1911)
 Gail Lee Bernstein (born 1939)
 Harold Bolitho (1939–2010)
 Hugh Borton (1903–1995)
 Albert M. Craig (born 1927)
 Sheldon Garon (born 1951)
 Carol Gluck (born 1941)
 Andrew Gordon (born 1952)
 William Elliot Griffis (1843–1928)
 John Whitney Hall (1916–1997)
 Susan Hanley (born 1939)
 Marius Jansen (1922–2000)
 Donald Keene (1922–2019)
 Joyce Lebra (1925-2021)
 Jeffrey Mass (1940–2001)
 Richard Ponsonby-Fane (1878–1937)
 Tetsuo Najita (1936–2021)
 Ian Nish (1926–2022)
 Edwin O. Reischauer (1910–1990)
 Donald Richie (1924–2013)
 George Bailey Sansom (1883–1965)
 Ernest Mason Satow (1843–1929)
 Amy Stanley (born 1978)
 Conrad Totman (born 1934)
 Stephen Turnbull (born 1948)
 Barak Kushner (born 1968)

History of Korea 
 Bruce Cumings (born 1943) – modern Korea
 Carter J. Eckert
 James Palais (1934–2006)
 Il-yeon (1206–1289)
 Kim Bu-sik (1075–1151) – early annalist
 Kim Dae-mun
 Lee Ki-baek (1924–2004)
 James Hoare (born 1943)
 Shin Chaeho (1880–1936) – ancient Korean history
 Andre Schmid (born 1963)
 Yu Deuk-gong (1749–1807) – Balhae
 Odd Arne Westad (born 1960) – professor at the London School of Economics

History of China 
 Robert Bickers (born 1964) - modern China
 Immanuel C.Y. Hsu (1923-2005) - modern China
 John Herman (1889–1950)
 Ann Paludan (1928–2014) – ancient China
 Sima Qian – compiled Records of the Grand Historian
 Chen Shou (233–297) – author of the Records of Three Kingdoms.
 Jonathan Spence (born 1936)
 Denis Twitchett (1925–2006) – Cambridge scholar, and editor of The Cambridge History of China
 Hans van de Ven (born 1958)
 Frederic Wakeman, Jr. (1937–2006)
 Odd Arne Westad (born 1960) – professor at the London School of Economics and author of many books on China

History of Hong Kong 
 John Mark Carroll (born 1961) 
 Joseph Ting Sun Pao (born 1951)
Steve Tsang (born 1959)
James Lau Chi-pang (born 1960)
Elizabeth Sinn Yuk Yee (born 1961
WONG, Man Kong Timothy

Africa 
 David Cohen (born 1943)
 A. G. Hopkins (born 1938) – European colonialism and globalisation
 William Miller Macmillan (1885–1974)
 Jocelyne Dakhlia (born 1959) – political and cultural history of Islam in the Maghreb
 Jan Vansina (1929–2017)

History of the Serers 
 Alioune Sarr (1908–2001), Senegalese specialist on Serer medieval history
 Henry Gravrand (1921–2003), French specialist on Serer ancient history, Serer medieval history and Serer religion
 Issa Laye Thiaw (1943–2017), Senegalese specialist on Serer general history and Serer religion
 Alhaji Alieu Ebrima Cham Joof (1924–2011), Gambian specialist on Serer general history and history of Senegambia (Senegal and Gambia)
 Marguerite Dupire (1920–2015), French scholar of Serer religion and history
 Louis Diène Faye (born 1936), Senegalese scholar of Serer religion and history

Oceania

History of Australia 
 Manning Clark (1915–1991)
 Keith Windschuttle (born 1942)
 Geoffrey Blainey (born 1930)
 Stuart Macintyre (1947–2021)
 Henry Reynolds (born 1938)
 Frank Welsh (born 1931)
Andrew Moore

History of Fiji 
 Brij Lal

History of New Zealand 
 James Belich (born 1956)
 Michael King (1945–2004)
 W. H. Oliver (1925–2015)
 William Pember Reeves (1857–1932)
 J. G. A. Pocock (born 1924)
 Keith Sinclair (1922–1993)

History of Tonga 
 Sione Lātūkefu

History of Papua New Guinea 
 John Waiko (born 1945)

By historical viewpoint

Abolitionist 
 George Washington Williams (1849–1891) – Early African-American historian

Counterfactual 
 Niall Ferguson (born 1964) – Virtual History: Alternatives and Counterfactuals (1997)

Marxist 
 Eric Foner (born 1943) – Marxist historian of the American Civil War and Reconstruction
 Eugene D. Genovese (1930–2012) – Marxist historian of southern US history and slavery
 Ranajit Guha (born 1923) – Indian Marxist historian
 Christopher Hill (1912–2003) – 17th century England
 Eric Hobsbawm (1917–2012) – Marxist historian of the modern world
 Gerald Horne (born 1949) – African American Marxist historian
 Timothy Wright Mason (1940–1990) – Marxist historian who worked on the history of National Socialism and the German working-class
 Maxime Rodinson (1915–2004) – French Marxist historian on the history of Islam
 Sumit Sarkar (born 1939) – Indian Marxist historian
 Edward Palmer Thompson (1924–1993) – British Marxist historian, author of The Making of the English Working Class
 Walter Rodney (1942–1980) – Marxist historian of Africa

Nazi 
 Walter Frank (1905–1945) – Nazi historian and anti-Semitic writer
 David Hoggan (1923–1988)

Anarchist 
 Paul Avrich (1931–2006) – USA, oral history of the U.S. and Russia
 Murray Bookchin (1921–2006) – USA, writer; founder of "social ecology"
 Sam Dolgoff (1902–1990) – USA, writer, activist, co-founder of Anarcho-Syndicalist Review
 Sébastien Faure (1858–1942) – France, Encyclopedie Anarchiste, 4 volumes (1932–1934)
 David Goodway – UK, writer, editor
 Daniel Guérin (1904–1988) – France, writer, editor Libertarian Communist
 Robert Graham (born 1958) – USA, writer, editor
 Andrej Grubacic – Bulgarian history and anarchism, lecturer at University of San Francisco
 Peter Marshall (born 1946) – England, historian, philosopher, writer (of Demanding the Impossible: A History of Anarchism, 1992)
 Chuck W. Morse (born 1969) – USA, writer, founder of "Institute for Anarchist Studies/IAS
 Max Nettlau (1865–1944) – Austria, writer of Geschichte der Anarchie, seven volumes
 Abel Paz (1921–2009) – Spain, Civil war, Durruti, CNT/FAI
 José Peirats (1908–1989) – Spain, historian of the CNT/FAI
 Alexandre Skirda (1942–2020)
 Antonio Tellez (1921–2005)
 Dana Ward – founder of "Anarchist Archives", Online Research on the History and Theory of Anarchism, (USA)
 George Woodcock (1912–1995)
 Howard Zinn (1922–2010)

Pacifist 
 Ludwig Quidde (1858–1941) – Prescient German pacifist and student of history who combined his specialties in his condemnation of Kaiser Wilhelm II

By general category

Architectural history 
 Marcus Vitruvius Pollio (c. 80/70 BC?–c. 25 BC) – Roman architect and engineer, author of De architectura
 Leon Battista Alberti (1404–1472) – Italian polymath, active in many fields, author of  De Re Aedificatoria among others
 Josef Strzygowski (1862–1941)
 Joseph Rykwert (born 1926)
 Manfredo Tafuri (1935–1994)
 David Watkin (historian) (1941–2018)
 Alberto Pérez-Gómez (born 1949)
 Doğan Kuban (1926–2021) – architect, history of architecture and art history

Art history 
 Nurhan Atasoy (born 1934, Tokat, Türkiye) – Turkish and Islamic Art History
 Vincent Cronin (1924–2011) – French and Italian art and architectural history
 Oleg Grabar (1929–2011) – Islamic Art History
 Catherine Mason – British computer and digital art history
 Nicholas Pevsner (1903–1983) – History of art and English architecture
 Alena Potůčková (1953–2018) – Czech art history
 Simon Schama (born 1945) – Art history
 Ichimatsu Tanaka (1895–1983) – Japanese art history
 Yukio Yashiro (1890–1975) – Japanese art history; Botticelli and the Florentine Renaissance

Christianity 
 Eusebius of Caesarea (c. 275–339) – "Father of Church history"
 Alexander Campbell Cheyne (1924–2006) – Scottish ecclesiastical historian
 John Gilmary Shea (1824–1892) – father of American Catholic History
 Bengt Hägglund (1920–2015) – historian of Christian theology
 Barbara Thiering (1930–2015) – rediscovered the "Pesher technique"

Classical Antiquity
 Werner Eck (born 1939)
 Robert Malcolm Errington (born 1939)
 Erich S. Gruen (born 1935)
 Ronald Syme (1903–1989)

Economic history 
 Robert C. Allen (born 1947)
 Leah Boustan
 Eli Heckscher (1879–1952)
 Barry Eichengreen (born 1952)
 Niall Ferguson (born 1964)
 Robert Fogel (1926–2013)
 Alexander Gerschenkron (1904–1978)
 Claudia Goldin (born 1946)
 Susan Howson (born 1945)
 Harold James (born 1956)
 John Komlos (born 1944)
 Naomi Lamoreaux (born 1950)
 David S. Landes (1924–2013)
 Joel Mokyr (born 1946)
 Thomas Piketty (born 1971)
 W. W. Rostow (1916–2003)
 Tirthankar Roy (born 1960)
 Ram Sharan Sharma (1919–2011) – economic history of ancient India
 Robert Skidelsky (born 1939)
 R. H. Tawney (1880–1962)

Egyptology
 Hans-Werner Fischer-Elfert (born 1954)
 Ludwig David Morenz (born 1965)
 Richard B. Parkinson (born 1963)
 William Kelly Simpson (1928–2017)
 John W. Tait (born 1945)
 Edward F. Wente (born 1930)
 Penelope Wilson

Environmental history 
 Christopher Smout (born 1933)
 William Cronon (born 1954) – Frederick Jackson Turner Professor of History, Geography, and Environmental Studies at the University of Wisconsin–Madison

Espionage 
 Christopher Andrew (born 1941)
 John Barron (1930–2005)
 John Earl Haynes (born 1944)
 David Kahn (born 1930)
 Victor Suvorov (born 1947)
 Nigel West (born 1951)

Food history 
 Sidney Mintz (1922–2015)
 Massimo Montanari (born 1949)
 Zora Mintalová – Zubercová (born 1950)

Gender history 
 John Boswell (1947–1994, American) – homosexuality in medieval times
 Francisca de Haan (fl. 1998-) – Central, Eastern and South Eastern European Women's and Gender History
 George Mosse (1918–1999)
 Marysa Navarro (born 1934) - feminism
 Retha Warnicke (born 1939) – gender issues

Historiography 
 Ram Sharan Sharma (1919–2011)
 Alphonse Balleydier (1810–1859)
 Marc Bloch (1886–1944)
 Fernand Braudel (1902–1985)
 Herbert Butterfield (1900–1979)
 E. H. Carr (1892–1982)
 R. G. Collingwood (1889–1943)
 Geoffrey Elton (1921–1994)
 Richard J. Evans (born 1947)
 Pieter Geyl (1887–1966)
 J. H. Hexter (1910–1996)
 Emmanuel Le Roy Ladurie (born 1929)
 Peter Novick (1934–2012)
 Leopold von Ranke (1795–1886)
 Hayden White (1928–2018)
 Frank Ankersmit (born 1945)

Academic protagonists in Australia's "history wars" 
 Geoffrey Blainey (born 1930)
 Stuart Macintyre (1947–2021)
 Robert Manne (born 1947)
 Henry Reynolds (born 1938)
 Lyndall Ryan (born 1943)
 Keith Windschuttle (born 1942)

History of business 
 Alfred D. Chandler, Jr. (1918–2007)
 Jan Glete (1947–2009) – Swedish business history
 Allan Nevins (1890–1971)

History of ideas, culture, literature, and philosophy 
 Ram Sharan Sharma (1919–2011) – material culture in Ancient India
 Isaiah Berlin (1909–1997) – history of ideas
 J.C.D. Clark (born 1951) – British historian of 18th century ideas
 Jovan Deretić (1934–2002), Serbian literary history
 Michel Foucault (1926–1984) – history of ideas
 Peter Gay (1923–2015) – history of ideas
 A.O. Lovejoy (1873-1962) - history of ideas
 Lewis Mumford (1895–1988) – history of technology
 Hüseyin Nihâl Atsız (1905–1975, İstanbul, Türkiye) – Turkology, Turkish Literature
 Pertev Naili Boratav (Mustafa Pertev) (1907–1998) – Turkish folklorist, Ottoman and Turkish culture
 Sedat Alp (1913–2006) – Hittitolo, historian, ancient Anatolian languages

History of international relations 
 Harry Elmer Barnes (1889–1968)
 Herbert Butterfield (1900–1979)
 E.H. Carr (1892–1982)
 Gordon A. Craig (1913–2005)
 John Lewis Gaddis (born 1941) – historian of the Cold War
 Ragnhild Hatton (1913–1995) – historian of 17th- and 18th-century international relations
 Klaus Hildebrand (born 1941)
 Andreas Hillgruber (1925–1989)
 Paul Kennedy (born 1945) – British historian, author of influential The Rise and Fall of the Great Powers
 William L. Langer (1896–1977)
 Arno J. Mayer (born 1926)
 Lewis Bernstein Namier (1888–1960)
 Paul W. Schroeder (born 1927) – U.S. historian, 19th-century European international relations
 Jean Edward Smith (1932–2019)
 A.J.P. Taylor (1906–1990) – historian of European international relations
 Harold Temperley, (1879–1939) – British historian, Cambridge, 19th- and early 20th-century diplomatic history, British Documents on the Origins of the War, 1898-1914 (ed.)
 Ernest Llewellyn Woodward, (1890–1971)
Karl W Schweizer,1946---)Diplomatic historian

History of science and technology 
 Michael Adas (born 1943) – colonialism and imperialism, global history
 Jim Bennett (born 1947) – mathematics, scientific instruments and astronomy
 Stephen G. Brush (born 1935)
 Vincent Cronin (1924–2011)
 Allen G. Debus (1926–2009) – chemistry and medicine
 A. Hunter Dupree (1921–2019) – botany; U.S. government policy on science and technology
 Peter Galison (born 1955) – physics, philosophy, objectivity
 John L. Heilbron (born 1934) – physics, quantification, astronomy, religion and science
 Richard L. Hills (1936–2019) – technology, steam power
 Thomas P. Hughes (1923–2014) – technology
 Evelyn Fox Keller (born 1936) – science and gender, biology
 Melvin Kranzberg (1917–1995) – technology
 Daniel J. Kevles (born 1939) – science and politics, physics, biology, eugenics
 Thomas Kuhn (1922–1996) – physics, "paradigm shifts"
 James Mosley (born 1935) – printing
 David F. Noble (1945–2010) – science and technology-based industrial development
 Abraham Pais (1918–2000) – physics
 Giuliano Pancaldi (born 1946) – Italian science
 Theodore M. Porter (born 1953)
 A. I. Sabra (1924–2013) – optics, Islamic science
 George Sarton (1884–1956)
 Jack Simmons (1915–2000) – railway history
 Nathan Sivin (born 1931) – history of science in China
 Kim H. Veltman (1948–2020) – science and art
 M. Norton Wise (born 1940)

History of the papacy 
 Ludwig von Pastor (1854–1928) – wrote 40 volume history of the popes making extensive use of the Vatican Secret Archives

Holocaust 

 Götz Aly (born 1947)
 Jean Ancel (1940–2008)
 Yitzhak Arad (1926–2021)
 David Bankier (1947–2010)
 Omer Bartov (born 1954)
 Paul R. Bartrop (born 1955)
 Yehuda Bauer (born 1926)
 Georges Bensoussan (born 1952)
 Wolfgang Benz (born 1941)
 Michael Berenbaum (born 1945)
 Ruth Bettina Birn (born 1952)
 Donald Bloxham
 Randolph L. Braham (1922–2018)
 Richard Breitman (born 1947)
 Martin Broszat (1926–1989)
 Christopher Browning (born 1944)
 Michael Burleigh (born 1955)
 David Cesarani (1956–2015)
 Catherine Chatterley
 Richard I. Cohen (born 1946)
 John S. Conway (1929–2017)
 David M. Crowe
 Danuta Czech (1922–2004)
 Szymon Datner (1902–1989)
 Lucy Dawidowicz (1915–1990)
 Martin C. dean (born 1962)
 Terrence Des Pres (1939–1987)
 Deborah Dwork
 Leo Eitinger (1912–1996)
 David Engel (born 1951)
 Barbara Engelking (born 1962)
 Richard J. Evans (born 1947)
 Andrew Ezergailis (born 1930)
 Esther Farbstein (born 1946)
 Norman Finkelstein (born 1953)
 Jack Fischel (born 1937)
 Michael Fleming
 Joseph Friedenson (1922–2013)
 Henry Friedlander (1930–2012)
 Saul Friedländer (born 1932)
 Tuvia Friling (born 1953)
 Christian Gerlach (born 1963)
 Martin Gilbert (1936–2015)
 Daniel Goldhagen (born 1959)
 Jan Grabowski (born 1962)
 Gideon Greif (born 1951)
 Jan T. Gross (born 1947)
 Israel Gutman (1923–2013)
 Peter Hayes
 Susanne Heim (born 1955)
 Raul Hilberg (1926–2007)
 Klaus Hildebrand (born 1941)
 Eberhard Jäckel (1929–2017)
 Miroslav Kárný (1919–2001)
 Steven T. Katz (born 1944)
 Ian Kershaw (born 1943)
 Ernst Klee (1942–2013)
 David Kranzler (1930–2007)
 Shmuel Krakowski (1926–2018)
 Erich Kulka (1911–1995)
 Otto Dov Kulka (1933–2021)
 Konrad Kwiet (born 1941)
 Lawrence Langer (born 1929)
 Jacek Leociak (born 1957)
 Dariusz Libionka (born 1963)
 Deborah Lipstadt (born 1947)
 Peter Longerich (born 1955)
 Richard C. Lukas (born 1937)
 Eugen Kogon (1903–1987)
 Michael Marrus (born 1941)
 Jürgen Matthäus (born 1959)
 Hans Mommsen (1930–2015)
 Kurt Pätzold (1930–2016)
 Franciszek Piper (born 1941)
 Detlev Peukert (1950–1990)
 Léon Poliakov (1910–1997)
 Antony Polonsky (born 1940)
 Dina Porat (born 1943)
 Laurence Rees (born 1957)
 Alvin H. Rosenfeld (born 1938)
 Mark Roseman (born 1958)
 John K. Roth
 Livia Rothkirchen (1922–2013)
 R. J. Rummel (1932–2014)
 Tom Segev (born 1945)
 Timothy D. Snyder (born 1969)
 Nicholas Stargardt (born 1962)
 Sybille Steinbacher (born 1966)
 Alan E. Steinweis (born 1957)
 Dan Stone (born 1971)
 Robert Jan van Pelt (born 1955)
 Nikolaus Wachsmann (born 1971)
 Kenneth Waltzer (born 1942)
 Rebecca Wittmann (born 1970)
 David Wyman (1929–2018)
 Hanna Yablonka (born 1950)
 Leni Yahil (1912–2007)

Lutheranism 
 Johann Lorenz von Mosheim (1694–1755) – Lutheran historian of Christianity from its inception through the 18th century

Maritime history 
 Robert G. Albion (1896–1983)
 William A. Baker (1911–1981)
 Jaap R. Bruijn (born 1938)
 Howard I. Chapelle (1901–1975)
 Grahame Farr (1912–1983)
 Femme Gaastra (born 1945)
 John Hattendorf (born 1941)
 John de Courcy Ireland (1911–2006)
 Benjamin Woods Labaree (1927–2021)
 Samuel Eliot Morison (1887–1976)
 J. H. Parry (1914–1982)
 Glyndwr Williams (born 1932)

Media history 
History of newspapers and magazines,
History of radio, History of television, and
History of the Internet
 Asa Briggs (1921–2016)

Military history 

 C.T. Atkinson (1874-1964), historian of the British Army and Marlborough's Army
 Correlli Barnett (born 1927) – British military historian
 Antony Beevor (born 1946) – British military historian
 Brian Bond (born 1936) – First World War
 Caleb Carr (born 1955) – American military historian
 Michael Carver (1915–2001) – British soldier and historian
 Alan Clark (1928–1999) – British M.P. and historian
 Martin van Creveld (born 1946) – Israeli military historian
 Saul David (born 1966) – Military history
 N.H. Gibbs (1910–1990) – Interwar period
 Adrian Goldsworthy (born 1969) – British military historian
 Jack Granatstein (born 1939) – Canadian military historian
 Bruce Barrymore Halpenny (born 1937) – writer and military historian
 Victor Davis Hanson (born 1953) – American classicist and military historian
 Andreas Hillgruber (1925–1989) – German military historian
 Richard Holmes (1946–2011) – British military history
 Alistair Horne (1925–2017) – British historian of French military history
 Michael Howard (1922–2019) – modern military history
 John Keegan (1934–2012, English) – specialised in 20th-century wars
 Anthony Kemp (1939–2018) – English historian of history of World War II
 Frederic Kidder (1804–1885) - American historian of New England including military operations
 B. H. Liddell Hart (1895–1970) – military history
 Edward Luttwak (born 1942) – military strategy
 Piers Mackesy (1924–2014) – 18th century
 S. L. A. Marshall (1900–1977) – American military historian
 Jürgen Möller (born 1959) – German military historian
 Peter Paret (1924–2020) – military history
 Gordon Prange (1910–1980)
 Alistair Horne (1923–2004) – military history
 Gerhard Ritter (1888–1967) – German military historian
 Cornelius Ryan (1920–1974) – World War II
 Digby Smith (born 1935) Napoleonic Wars
 Jean Edward Smith (1932–2019) – U.S. and German military historian
 Hew Strachan (born 1949) – British military historian
 Gerhard Weinberg (born 1928) – U.S. military historian
 Spenser Wilkinson (1853–1937)

Mormonism 
 Leonard J. Arrington (1917–1999) – LDS Church historian 1975–1982
 B.H. Roberts (1857–1933)
 Fawn M. Brodie (1915–1981)
 Richard Bushman (born 1931)

Naval history 
 Robert G. Albion (1896–1983) – maritime history
 Daniel A. Baugh (born 1931)
 Ulane Bonnel (1918–2006)
 Josiah Burchett (1666–1746)
 Montagu Burrows (1819–1905)
 Geoffrey Callender (1875–1946)
 Howard I. Chapelle (1901–1975) – maritime history
 William Bell Clark (1889–1968)
 Julian Corbett (1854–1922)
 William S. Dudley (born 1936)
 Michael Duffy
 Jan Glete (1947–2009)
 James Goldrick (born 1958)
 Andrew Gordon (born 1951) – Battle of Jutland
 Barry M. Gough (born 1938)
 Kenneth J. Hagan (born 1936)
 Paul G. Halpern (born 1937)
 John Hattendorf (born 1941)
 John Daniel Hayes (1902–1991)
 J. Richard Hill (1929–2017)
 William James (1780–1827)
 Paul Kennedy (born 1945)
 R.J.B. Knight (born 1944)
 Dudley W. Knox (1877–1960)
 Andrew Lambert (born 1956)
 Harold D. Langley (1925–2020)
 John Knox Laughton (1830–1915)
 Michael Lewis (1890–1970)
 Christopher Lloyd (1906–1986)
 Alfred Mahan (1840–1914)
 Arthur Marder (1910–1980)
 Tyrone G. Martin (born 1930) – historian of the USS Constitution and of the history of ironclads
 William J. Morgan (1917–2003)
 Samuel Eliot Morison (1887–1976) – wrote History of United States Naval Operations in World War II and numerous works about the maritime exploration of the Americas
 Henry Newbolt (1862–1938) – wrote The Naval History of the Great War
 Michael Oppenheim (1853–1927)
 Charles O. Paullin (1869–1944)
 Werner Rahn (born 1939)
 Bryan Ranft (1917–2001)
 Clark G. Reynolds (1939–2005)
 Herbert Richmond (1871–1946)
 N.A.M. Rodger (born 1949)
 Stephen Roskill (1903–1982)
 John Darrell Sherwood (born 1966)
 D.M. Schurman (1924–2013)
 William N. Still, Jr. (born 1932)
 Craig Symonds (born 1946)
 David Syrett (1939–2004)
 Geoffrey Till (born 1945)
 Johan Carel Marinus Warnsinck (1882–1943)
 Colin White (1951–2008)

Presbyterianism 
 D.G. Hart (born 1956)

Social history 
 David Rothman (1937-2020) — Father of American social history and the role of institutions in shaping history and society.
 Ram Sharan Sharma (1919–2011) – social history of ancient India
 Lloyd deMause (born 1931) – psychohistory
 Gabriela Dudeková (born 1968)
 Ruth Goodman (born 1963) – early modern, British social history

World history 
 Felipe Fernández-Armesto (born 1950)
 Christopher Bayly (1945–2015) – British Empire and India
 Ferdinand Braudel (1902–1985) – social and economic history
 Will Durant (1885–1981) – author of The Story of Civilization
 Francis Fukuyama (born 1955) – "End of history" thesis
 Hendrik Willem van Loon (1882–1944) – world history and geography for younger readers
 William McNeill (1917–2016) – author of The Rise of the West: A History of the Human Community
 Jürgen Osterhammel (born 1952)
 John Roberts (1928–2003) – author of History of the World
 Ram Sharan Sharma (1919–2011)) – author of Vishwa Itihaas ki Bhumika in Hindi.
 Jackson J. Spielvogel (born 1939) – Pennsylvania State University, author of several major world history textbooks
 Arnold J. Toynbee (1889–1975) – wrote landmark text A Study of History
 Immanuel Wallerstein (1930–2019)

Biography 
 Peter Ackroyd (born 1949) - Dickens, Blake, Thomas More, Eliot, Newton
 James Boswell (1740–1795) - Samuel Johnson
 Alan Bullock (1914–2004) – historian best known for his influential biography of Hitler
 Robert Caro (born 1935) – biographer of Lyndon Johnson
 Thomas Carlyle (1795–1881) – Friedrich der Grosse (the Great)
 Vincent Cronin (1924–2011) – Louis XIV, Louis XVI and Marie Antoinette, Catherine the Great, and Napoleon
 Leon Edel (1907–1997) - Henry James
 Richard Ellmann (1918–1987) – James Joyce
 Erik Erikson (1902–1994) - psychoanalytic biographies of Luther and Gandhi
 Roy Foster (born 1949) - W.B. Yeats
 Joseph Frank (1918–2013) - Fyodor Dostoevsky
 Elizabeth Gaskell (1810–1865) - Charlotte Brontë
 Stephen Greenblatt (born 1943) - Shakespeare
 Ragnhild Hatton (1913–1995) – biographer of King Charles XII of Sweden and King George I of Great Britain
 Walter Isaacson (born 1952) - Einstein
 Ian Kershaw (born 1943) – historian well known for his influential study of Hitler
 Ralph G. Martin (1920–2013) – biographer of Hubert H. Humphrey, Harry S. Truman, Edward VIII, Golda Meir and John F. Kennedy
 Roi Medvedev (born 1925) – Stalin biographer
 Susan Quinn (born 1940) - Marie Curie
 Ron Rosenbaum (born 1946) – author of Explaining Hitler
 Norman Sherry (1925–2016) - Graham Greene
 Jean Edward Smith (1932–2019) – author of biographies on Franklin D. Roosevelt, Ulysses S. Grant, John Marshall, and Lucius D. Clay
 Suetonius - lives of the Caesars
 Lytton Strachey (1880–1932) - Eminent Victorians
 A.N. Wilson (born 1950) - Tolstoy

References

Historiography
Historians by area